The Unattainable is a 1916 American Blank and White silent drama directed by Lloyd B. Carleton.  The film is based on the story by Elwood D. Henning.  The photoplay stars Dorothy Davenport and Emory Johnson. 
 
The film opens by introducing us to Bessie Gale, a regular on the New York nightclub scene. In her circle, she's known as "the unattainable." A wealthy gentleman starts to pursue her. She finds relief from his romantic pursuits by joining a traveling theatrical company. The troop heads out West. After Bessie misses a train connection, she meets a sheep rancher, and they get married. Then, her husband makes a major discovery which leads to a new series of adventures. 

The film was released on September 4, 1916, by Universal  



Plot

Cast
{| 
! style="width: 180px; text-align: left;" |  Actor
! style="width: 230px; text-align: left;" |  Role
|- style="text-align: left;"
|Dorothy Davenport||Bessie Gale
|-
|Emory Johnson||Robert Goodman
|-
|Mattie Witting||Mrs. Goodman
|-
|Richard Morris||Henry Morton
|-
|Alfred Allen||Theatre Manager
|-
|}

Production

Pre production

Development
According to the book - The Universal Story, Carl Laemmle (1867-1939) produced around 91 movies in 1916.
Lloyd B. Carleton (–1933) started working for Carl Laemmle in the Fall of 1915. Carleton arrived with impeccable credentials, having directed some 60 films for the likes of Thanhouser, Lubin, Fox, and Selig. Between March and December 1916, 44-year-old Lloyd Carleton directed 16 movies for Universal, starting with The Yaqui and ending with The Morals of Hilda. Emory Johnson acted in all 16 of these films. Of Carleton's total 1916 output, 11 were feature films, and the rest were two-reel shorts.  In 1916, Carleton directed all 13 films pairing Dorothy Davenport and Emory Johnson. This film would be the ninth in the 13-film series. These totals show Carl Laemmle was clearly giving the Davenport-Johnson pairing one of his elite directors from the working cadre of universal directors to produce the screen chemistry Laemmle was seeking.

Casting
Dorothy Davenport (1895-1977) was an established star for Universal when the  year-old actress played Bessie Gale. She had acted in hundreds of movies by the time she starred in this film. The majority of these films were 2-reel shorts, as was the norm in Hollywood's teen years. She had been making movies since 1910. She started dating Wally Reid when she was barely 16, and he was 20. They married in 1913. After her husband died in 1923, she used the name "Mrs. Wallace Reid" in the credits for any project she took part in. Besides being an actress, she would eventually become a film director, producer, and writer.
Emory Johnson (1894-1960) was  years old when he acted in this movie as Robert Goodman. In January 1916, Emory signed a contract with Universal Film Manufacturing Company. Carl Laemmle of Universal Film Manufacturing Company thought he saw great potential in Johnson, so he chooses him to be Universal's new leading man. Laemmle's hope was Johnson would become another Wallace Reed. A major part of his plan was to create a movie couple that would sizzle on the silver screen. Laemmle thought Dorothy Davenport and Emory Johnson could create the chemistry he sought. Johnson and Davenport would complete 13 films together. They started with the successful feature production of Doctor Neighbor in May 1916 and ended with The Devil's Bondwoman in November 1916. After completing the last movie, Laemmle thought Johnson did not have the screen presence he wanted. He decided not to renew his contract. Johnson would make 17 movies in 1916, including 6 shorts and 11 feature-length Dramas. 1916 would become the second-highest movie output of his entire acting career. Emory acted in 25 films for Universal, mostly dramas with a sprinkling of comedies and westerns. 
Richard Morris (1862-1924) was a  year-old actor when he played Henry Morton. He was a character actor and former opera singer known for Granny (1913). He would eventually participate in many Johnson projects, including  |In the Name of the Law (1922),  The Third Alarm (1922),  The West~Bound Limited (1923), The Mailman (1923) until his untimely death in 1924. 
Alfred Allen (1866-1947) was  years old when he was selected to play Theatre Manager. Allen was highly educated, had a commanding presence and stood six feet tall, and weighed two hundred pounds. He got his start in the film industry at Universal city in 1913.  He landed his first role in 1915. His roles were character parts, and he played mostly fathers, villains, or ranch owners. Alfred Allen appeared in 69 features from 1916 through 1929. After Heartaches he would appear in four more Davenport-Johnson projects: ‘’A Yoke of Gold,’’ The Unattainable, The Human Gamble and Barriers of Society.

Screenplay
This film is based on a story by Elwood D. Henning. 
Eugene B. Lewis (1878–1924) created the screen adaptation for this film.

Filming
To capture the rustic atmosphere called for in the film, director Lloyd Carleton's company paid a visit to a big sheep ranch located near Los Angeles, California. The ranch was located in the northwestern San Fernando Valley region of Los Angeles.  The surrounding area provided one of several ideal backgrounds for the film. Hence, broad segments of the film's exteriors were shot in Chatsworth Park, California. 
Another area ideally suited for background footage was the  Sierra Nevada Mountains located in the state of Nevada.

Alternate title
During the film's development, the working title was - The Miracle of Love.

Post production
The theatrical release of this film totaled five reels or 4,921 feet of film. As is often the case, the listed time for this feature-length movie varies. The average time per 1,000-foot 35mm reel varied between ten and fifteen minutes per reel at the time. Thus, the total time for this movie is computed between fifty and seventy-five minutes.

Studios
The interiors were filmed in the studio complex at Universal Studios located at 100 Universal City Plaza in  Universal City, California.

Release and reception

Official release
The copyright was filed with U.S. Copyright Office and entered into the record as shown:
 THE UNATTAINABLE. 1916 5 reels.
Credits:Director, Lloyd B. Carleton;
story, Elwood D. Hemming; scenario,
Eugene B. Lewis
© Bluebird Photoplays, Inc., 10Aug16;
LP8898
The official film release date to US theaters was September 4, 1916.

Advertising
Based on an American Film Institute standard, films with a running time of forty-five minutes or longer are considered feature films. In 1915, feature films were becoming more the trend in Hollywood.  In 1916, Universal formed a three-tier branding system for their releases. Universal films decided to label their films according to the size of their budget and status.  Bear in mind, Universal, unlike the top-tier studios, did not own any theaters to market its feature films. Universal gave theater owners and audiences a quick reference guide by branding their product.  Branding would assist theater owners in making a judgment for films they were about to lease and help fans decide which movies they wanted to see.

Universal released three different types of feature motion pictures:
 Red feather Photoplays – low budget feature films
 Bluebird Photoplays – Mainstream feature release and more ambitious productions
 Jewel – prestige motion pictures featuring high budgets using prominent actors
This film carried Universal’s "Bluebird Photoplay" brand, designating a more mainstream feature and a bigger budget than a red feather production. Bluebirds were also known for distinctive artwork, as displayed in the movie poster for this page.

Reviews
The critics generally panned this film.

Critical Response
In the September 2, 1916 issue of The Moving Picture World, movie critic Margaret McDonald observed:
  It is difficult to believe that Bluebird Photoplays Inc. would place on their program a picture as crude in construction and amateurish in action as "The Unattainable."  . . .  It is technically and dramatically speaking unusually poor.

In the September 2, 1916 issue of the Motion Picture News, movie critic Harvey Thew discerns:
  Although this picture is well and carefully produced, with a wealth of beautiful locations and photography, there is nothing to mark it as anything out of the usual in the way of photoplay offerings.  There are a number of important points which do not ring true.

Preservation status

A report created by film historian and archivist David Pierce for the Library of Congress claims:
75% of original silent-era films have perished.
14% of the 10,919 silent films released by major studios exist in their original 35mm or other formats.
11% survive in full-length foreign versions or on film formats of lesser image quality. Many silent-era films did not survive for reasons as explained on this Wikipedia page.

In 1978, an extraordinary discovery was made in Dawson City located in Yukon's Canadian territory. The city unknowingly had used a large cache of silent films to bolster a sagging hockey rink in 1929. The permafrost preserved them. The 1978 discovery would yield 533 reels of nitrate film containing numerous lost movies. The discovery was chronicled in the movie -  Dawson City: Frozen Time. Among the Dawson Film Find were the 5-reel bluebird production of The Unattainable, released in September 1916, and Barriers of Society released on October 16, 1916.  In both cases, only one reel was recoverable from each of the 5 reel feature films. The finders turned over these recovered reels to the Library of Congress. The website of the Library of Congress displays the following:
Holdings: U.S. Archive
Completeness: fragment
Archive: National Archives Of Canada (Ottawa) [Cao], Library of Congress (Washington). 
Note: 35 mm Nitrate Positive: Usw 35 mm Acetate Dupe Negative: Usw
Complete: Usw: Incomplete (Reel 1 Of 5). Record No.: 40065
Note: Dawson City

Gallery

References

External links

1916 lost films
1916 drama films
1916 films
American black-and-white films
American silent short films
Lost American films
Silent American drama films
Universal Pictures films
Films directed by Lloyd B. Carleton
1910s English-language films
1910s American films